The year 1533 in science and technology included a number of events, some of which are listed here.

Astronomy

Botany
 Rembert Dodoens publishes his .

Exploration
 Fortún Ximénez is the first European known to land in Baja California (where he is killed by natives).

History of science
 Georgius Agricola publishes  on the weights and measures of Classical antiquity.

Mathematics
 First printed edition of Euclid's Elements in the original Greek published in Basel, edited by Simon Grynaeus including integral diagrams and the first printing of Proclus' commentary on the first book.
 Gemma Frisius publishes  in Antwerp, containing the first known statement of the principles of triangulation and a means for determining longitude.

Technology
 Antonio da Sangallo the Younger constructs the Fortezza da Basso in Florence, considered as a model in bastion fortress design.

Births
 May 20 – Hieronymus Fabricius, Italian anatomist (died 1619)
 August 2 – Theodor Zwinger the elder, Swiss philosopher, physician and encyclopedist (died 1588)
 November 23 – Prospero Alpini, Venetian-born physician and botanist (died 1617)
 Approx. date
 Jacques Le Moyne de Morgues, French scientific illustrator (died 1588)
 Friedrich Risner, German mathematician (died 1580)
 Lucas Janszoon Waghenaer, Dutch nautical chartmaker (died 1606)

Deaths
 May 31 – Ambrosius Ehinger, Bavarian explorer of South America (born c. 1500)
 August 16 – Diogo Ribeiro, Portuguese-Spanish cartographer and explorer (b. unknown)
 Johannes Ruysch, cartographer (born c. 1460?)

References

 
16th century in science
1530s in science